Mularoni is a surname. Notable people with the surname include:

Antonella Mularoni (born 1961), Sammarinese politician
Diego Mularoni (born 1979), Sammarinese swimmer
Loris Mularoni (born 1976), Sammarinese judoka
Marcello Mularoni (born 1998), Sammarinese footballer
Mariella Mularoni (born 1962), Sammarinese politician